The Decepticons were a Brooklyn street gang active from the late 1980s into the early 1990s. Originating as a bond of "brotherhood" and taking their name from the main antagonists of the Transformers franchise, the gang soon escalated into one of the most feared gangs of their time with their flash mob style attacks and muggings.

History
The Decepticons were a street gang or street organization that thrived from the mid 80s through the early 90s. Their members were teenagers and young adults ranging from the age of 15 to early 20s. The gang was most prominent in Brooklyn, but at their peak the group consisted of multiple branches all across New York City. In an interview with former Decepticon General Steele, it is mentioned that there were branches of Decepticons in Clinton Hills, Flatbush, East Flatbush, and Bed Stuy Brooklyn, and parts of Queens. Steele references in his interview how the Decepticons were all over the place in patches due to the groups upbringing.The original group of Decepticons started in Brooklyn, New York with three boys from two different schools.

Impact on society
Their presence began to fade in the early 1990s. A few members went on to notable rap careers such as Sticky Fingaz, Fredro Starr, Rock and Sean Price. Fredro Starr was in the rap group Onyx with Sticky Fingaz, and also a protégé to Jam Master Jay. Sean Price (also known as Ruck) and Rock formed the hip hop group Heltah Skeltah as well as frequently collaborated on albums such as Price's Monkey Barz and Smif-N-Wessun's Smif 'n' Wessun: Reloaded. Rock even had his songs put into video games: "I Am Rock" for Need for Speed: Most Wanted and NFL Street 2, and "This Is Me" for Blitz: The League II. While a member of the Decepticons, Rock found himself arrested for assault and an attempted murder charge for allegedly shooting a rival pimp, while he worked as one. Hip-hop artist Jay-Z has made reference to the Decepticons and Lo Lifes in song. In "B.K Anthem", Jay raps "Wasn't safe on the A-Train, D, G or the F / Decepticons, Lo Life niggas snatch the polos off your chest."

Divisions 
The Original Decepticons, or Decepts, were Megatron, from Brooklyn Technical High School, as well as Rumble and Cyclonis, from Bushwick. However, from there, the group quickly expanded and multiplied. Lacking a formal structure, groups would often spring up and claim that they were Decepts. Latin groups of Decepts formed in the Bronx and Queens, therefore expanding the territory that Decepticons occupied. In Brooklyn, local offshoot groups of Decepticons would often sprout up. There were even female counterpart to the Decepticons called the Deceptinettes, whom were said to be equally as mischievous as the men. They had brutal initiation rituals for new members. Contrary to popular belief the Deceptinettes were already a group of friends even before meeting the Decepticons. There was never a time in the history of the Decepticons that a Deceptinette had to sleep her way into the gang. Membership was earned through loyalty and violence.

Motive 
As a whole, the Decepticons had no primary goal. They were poor kids living in impoverished neighborhoods who came together in order to try and make the tough situation in which they were dealt easier for one another. Acts of violence would most frequently come in the form of robberies. The gang would converge on the subways and from there hangout on the corners of streets by neighboring schools. If a physically weak looking target approached them, the gang would surround them and swiftly mug them. Another common spot for their robberies were on the subways themselves. Being a very small, crowded, noisy setting, the Decepticons would rush into the room, robbing people of whatever they can and then rushing out like a gust of wind. The Deceptinettes would play games such as "One Punch Knockout" for fun. In this game they would assault a random, unsuspecting person to see if they could knock them out with one punch- a pastime thought to have been played by both the girls and the boys.

References

Former gangs in New York City
Street gangs